The San Félix River (Río San Félix) is a river of Panama.

See also
List of rivers of Panama
List of rivers of the Americas by coastline

References

 Rand McNally, The New International Atlas, 1993.
CIA map, 1995.

Rivers of Panama